Lieutenant-General Sir John Bagot Glubb, KCB, CMG, DSO, OBE, MC, KStJ, KPM (16 April 1897 – 17 March 1986), known as Glubb Pasha, was a British soldier, scholar, and author, who led and trained Transjordan's Arab Legion between 1939 and 1956 as its commanding general. During the First World War, he served in France. Glubb has been described as an "integral tool in the maintenance of British control."

Life
Born in Preston, Lancashire, and educated at Cheltenham College, Glubb gained a commission in the Royal Engineers in 1915. On the Western Front of World War I, he suffered a shattered jaw. In later years, this would lead to his Arab nickname of Abu Hunaik, meaning "the one with the little jaw". He was then transferred to Iraq in 1920, which Britain had started governing under a League of Nations Mandate following war, and was posted to Ramadi in 1922 "to maintain a rickety floating bridge over the river [Euphrates], carried on boats made of reeds daubed with bitumen", as he later put it. He became an officer of the Arab Legion in 1930. The next year he formed the Desert Patrol – a force consisting exclusively of Bedouin – to curb the raiding problem that plagued the southern part of the country. Within a few years he had persuaded the Bedouin to abandon their habit of raiding neighbouring tribes.

In 1939, Glubb succeeded Frederick G. Peake as the commander of the Arab Legion (subsequently known as the Jordan Royal Army). During this period, he transformed the Legion into the best-trained force in the Arab world.

According to the Encyclopædia of the Orient:

Glubb served his home country all through his years in the Middle East, making him immensely unpopular in the end. Arab nationalists believed that he had been the force behind pressure that tried to make King Hussein I of Jordan join the Baghdad Pact, however this was unsuccessful. Glubb served different high positions in the Arab Legion, the army of Transjordan. During World War II he led attacks on Arab leaders in Iraq, as well as the Vichy regime which was present in Lebanon and Syria.

During the 1948 Arab–Israeli War, the Arab Legion was considered the strongest Arab army involved in the war. Glubb led the Arab Legion across the River Jordan to occupy the West Bank (May 1948). Despite some negotiation and understanding between the Jewish Agency and King Abdullah, severe fighting took place in Kfar Etzion massacre (May 1948), Jerusalem and Latrun (May–July 1948). According to Avi Shlaim,

Rumours that Abdullah was once again in contact with the Jewish leaders further damaged his standing in the Arab world. His many critics suggested that he was prepared to compromise the Arab claim to the whole of Palestine as long as he could acquire part of Palestine for himself. 'The internecine struggles of the Arabs,' reported Glubb, 'are more in the minds of Arab politicians than the struggle against the Jews. Azzam Pasha, the mufti and the Syrian government would sooner see the Jews get the whole of Palestine than that King Abdullah should benefit.' (p. 96)

Glubb remained in charge of the defence of the West Bank following the armistice in March 1949. He retained command of the Arab Legion until 1 March 1956, when King Hussein dismissed him and several other British senior officers in the Arab Legion. Hussein wanted to distance himself from the British and to disprove the contention of Arab nationalists that Glubb was the actual ruler of Jordan. Differences between Glubb and Hussein had been apparent since 1952, especially over defence arrangements, the promotion of Arab officers and the funding of the Legion. Despite his decommission, which was forced upon him by public opinion, Glubb remained a close friend of the king. 

He spent the remainder of his life writing books and articles, mostly on the Middle East and on his experiences with the Arabs.  

He served on the Board of Governors of Monkton Combe School from 1956 to 1966.

Glubb died in 1986 at his home in Mayfield, East Sussex. King Hussein gave the eulogy at the service of thanksgiving for Glubb's life, held in Westminster Abbey on 17 April 1986. A stained glass window in his local church, St Dunstan's Church, Mayfield, celebrates his life and legacy.  

His widow died in 2006, whereupon his papers were deposited with the Middle East Centre Archive at St Antony's College, Oxford.

Honours
Glubb was appointed OBE in 1925; CMG in 1946; and KCB in 1956.

Family
Glubb's father was Major-General Sir Frederic Manley Glubb, of Lancashire, who had been chief engineer in the British Second Army during the First World War; his mother was Letitia Bagot from County Roscommon. He was a brother of the racing driver Gwenda Hawkes.

In 1938, Glubb married Muriel Rosemary Forbes, the daughter of physician James Graham Forbes. The couple had a son, Godfrey (named after the Crusader King Godfrey of Bouillon) born in Jerusalem in 1939, and another son was born in May 1940 but lived only a few days. In 1944, they adopted Naomi, a Bedouin girl who was then three months old, and in 1948 they adopted two Palestinian refugee children called Atalla, renamed John and Mary.

Autobiography

Reception
Glubb's autobiographical story A Soldier with the Arabs was reviewed in The Atlantic Monthly, April 1958; The National Review, May 1958; The Saturday Review, February 1958; The Reporter, April 1958; The New Yorker, October 1958; and Foreign Affairs, April 1958.

Writing in The Reporter, Ray Alan commented that the book was more than just an apologia; while it provided "no serious political analysis or social observation", it did offer interesting insights into the period, even if Glubb was out of touch with later trends in Middle Eastern politics. What Alan found more surprising was that Glubb also had hardly anything new to say about the 1948 Palestine war "in which he had star billing," instead lapsing into self-justifying propaganda. Alan ends his review with a long quotation from T. E. Lawrence, in which he reflects on what role a foreigner may play, and prays to God that "men will not, for love of the glamour of strangeness, go out to prostitute themselves and their talents in serving another race", but will let them "take what action or reaction they please from [his] silent example".

Writing in the Saturday Review, Carl Hermann Voss commented that Glubb served with and for the Arabs for 36 years, 17 of them for King Abdullah of Jordan. The portrait photograph is captioned "Glubb Pasha—'I ... failed hopelessly.'" Voss calls the book well written, absorbing, and often deeply moving; engrossing and informative, no matter how subjective; but also overly long. He enjoys the sensitive and lyrical writing that in places "could be scanned as poetry", feeling the "sudden fury of a border raid".

Legacy
In his 1993 poetry collection, Out of Danger, James Fenton mentions Glubb Pasha in "Here Come the Drum Majorettes!": "There's a Gleb on a steppe in a dacha. There's a Glob on a dig on the slack side. There's a Glubb in the sand (he's a pasha)."

Writings
The source for the following bibliography is
Contemporary Authors Online, Gale, 2005. Reproduced in Biography Resource Center. Farmington Hills, Mich.: Thomson Gale. 2005, except *.
 (With Henry Field) The Yezidis, Sulubba, and Other Tribes of Iraq and Adjacent Regions, G. Banta, 1943.
 , Hodder & Stoughton, 1948, Da Capo Press, 1976.
 , Hodder & Stoughton, 1957.
 Britain and the Arabs: A Study of Fifty Years, 1908 to 1958, Hodder & Stoughton, 1959.
 War in the Desert: An R.A.F. Frontier Campaign, Hodder & Stoughton, 1960, Norton, 1961.
 The Great Arab Conquests, Hodder & Stoughton, 1963, Prentice-Hall, 1964.
 The Empire of the Arabs, Hodder & Stoughton, 1963, Prentice-Hall, 1964.
 The Course of Empire: The Arabs and Their Successors, Hodder & Stoughton, 1965, Prentice-Hall, 1966.
 The Lost Centuries: From the Muslim Empires to the Renaissance of Europe, 1145–1453, Hodder & Stoughton, 1966, Prentice-Hall, 1967.
 Syria, Lebanon and Jordan, Walker & Co., 1967.
 The Middle East Crisis: A Personal Interpretation, Hodder & Stoughton, 1967.
 A Short History of the Arab Peoples, Stein & Day, 1969.
 The Life and Times of Muhammad, Stein & Day, 1970.
 , Hodder & Stoughton, 1971 (unavailable on line 8 Aug. 2021).
 Soldiers of Fortune: The Story of the Mamlukes, Stein & Day, 1973.
  The Way of Love: Lessons from a Long Life, Hodder & Stoughton, 1974.
 Haroon Al Rasheed and the Great Abbasids, Hodder & Stoughton, 1976.
 Into Battle: A Soldier's Diary of the Great War, Cassell, 1977.
 , Blackwood (Edinburgh), 1978.
 Arabian Adventures: Ten Years of Joyful Service, Cassell (London), 1978.
 The Changing Scenes of Life: An Autobiography, Quartet Books (London), 1983.

See also
 Kfar Etzion massacre
 Hadassah medical convoy massacre

References

Further reading

 Alon, Yoav. "British Colonialism and Orientalism in Arabia: Glubb Pasha in Transjordan, 1930-1946." British Scholar 3.1 (2010): 105–126.
 Bradshaw, Tancred. The Glubb Reports: Glubb Pasha and Britain's Empire Project in the Middle East 1920-1956 (Springer, 2016).
 Hughes, Matthew. "The Conduct of Operations: Glubb Pasha, the Arab Legion, and the First Arab–Israeli War, 1948–49." War in History 26.4 (2019): 539–562. online
 Jevon, Graham. Glubb Pasha and the Arab Legion: Britain, Jordan and the End of Empire in the Middle East (2017).
Jevon, Graham. Jordan, "Palestine and the British World System, 1945-57: Glubb Pasha and the Arab Legion" (PhD. Diss. Oxford University, 2014)  online.
 Lunt, James, "Glubb, Sir John Bagot (1897–1986)", rev., Oxford Dictionary of National Biography, Oxford University Press, 2004, 
 Lunt, James D. Glubb Pasha, a Biography: Lieutenant-General Sir John Bagot Glubb, Commander of the Arab Legion, 1939-1956 (Harvill Press, 1984).
 Meyer, Karl E.; Brysac, Shareen Blair, Kingmakers: the Invention of the Modern Middle East, W.W. Norton, 2008,  pp 259–92.
 Morris, Benny, The Road to Jerusalem: Glubb Pasha, Palestine and the Jews, 
 Royle, Trevor. Glubb Pasha: The Life and Times of Sir John Bagot Glubb, Commander of the Arab Legion (Little, Brown, 1991).
 Shlaim, A. (2001). "Israel and the Arab Coalition in 1948" in E. L. Rogan, A. Shlaim, C. Tripp, J. A. Clancy-Smith, I. Gershoni, R. Owen, Y. Sayigh & J. E. Tucker (Eds.), The War for Palestine: Rewriting the History of 1948 (pp. 79–103). Cambridge: Cambridge University Press.

External links
 
 1956 – King of Jordan sacks British general (BBC article and video)
 Review: The Road to Jerusalem by Benny Morris, The Guardian
 
 
  THE FATE OF EMPIRES and SEARCH FOR SURVIVAL, by Sir John Glubb (Archive)
 Imperial War Museum Interview
 Obituary in New York Times

Photos
 Glubb Pasha on the right with King Abdullah in the middle
 The Desert Patrol

1897 births
1986 deaths
British generals
British Army personnel of World War I
British Army personnel of World War II
People of the 1948 Arab–Israeli War
Jordanian people of the 1948 Arab–Israeli War
20th-century British writers
Companions of the Distinguished Service Order
Companions of the Order of St Michael and St George
Jordanian generals
Knights Commander of the Order of the Bath
Officers of the Order of the British Empire
People educated at Cheltenham College
British orientalists
British Anglicans
Pashas
Writers from Preston, Lancashire
Royal Engineers officers
British colonial army officers
People associated with The Institute for Cultural Research
Governors of Monkton Combe School
People from Mayfield, East Sussex
Military personnel from Preston, Lancashire